North Ronaldsay Airport  is located on North Ronaldsay island,  northeast by north of Kirkwall, Orkney Islands, Scotland.

North Ronaldsay Aerodrome has a CAA Ordinary Licence (Number P538) that allows flights for the public transport of passengers or for flying instruction as authorised by the licensee (Orkney Islands Council). The aerodrome is not licensed for night use.

Airline and destinations

References

External links
Orkney Islands Council

Airports in Orkney
North Ronaldsay